The 2011 Enugu State gubernatorial election was the 5th gubernatorial election of Enugu State. Held on April 26, 2011, the People's Democratic Party nominee Sullivan Chime won the election, defeating Okey Ezea of the Labour Party.

Results 
A total of 16 candidates contested in the election. Sullivan Chime from the People's Democratic Party won the election, defeating Okey Ezea from the Labour Party. Registered voters was 1,324,197, valid votes was 491,138, votes cast was 502,213, 11,075 votes was cancelled.

References 

Enugu State gubernatorial elections
Enugu gubernatorial
April 2011 events in Nigeria